Ralph James Dunnet Hunt AO (31 March 192822 May 2011) was a Deputy Leader of the National Party of Australia.

Hunt was born in Narrabri, New South Wales to an established farming and grazing family, which traditions he continued after completing his schooling at The Scots College, Sydney.  His mother's family, the Dunnetts, owned the North Western Courier newspaper.  He was a councillor of Boomi Shire Council from 1956 to 1968 and Vice-President from 1962 to 1968.

He won the seat of Gwydir in the Australian Parliament for the Country Party at a by-election in June 1969 following the resignation of Ian Allan. He was appointed Minister for the Interior in the Second Gorton Ministry in February 1971 and retained that position in the McMahon Ministry until the defeat of the government at the 1972 election.

Following the Liberal-National Country Party Coalition's win at the 1975 election, Malcolm Fraser appointed him Minister for Health.  He was responsible for introducing Medibank Mark II.  In December 1979, Fraser appointed Hunt Minister for Transport.  His portfolio became Transport and Construction in April 1982, but the coalition government was defeated at the 1983 election.

He had returned to the backbench in preparation for retirement; but when Doug Anthony resigned in 1984, Hunt was persuaded to return to the front bench and was elected Deputy Leader of the National Party to Ian Sinclair, holding the position from 1984 to 1987. He became shadow minister for primary industries, and resigned from Parliament in February 1989.

He was made an Officer of the Order of Australia in January 1990.

Ralph Hunt died in Sydney on 22 May 2011, aged 83.  He was survived by his wife Miriam (Mim) née McMahon, whom he married in 1953; and three children.

Notes

Members of the Cabinet of Australia
National Party of Australia members of the Parliament of Australia
Members of the Australian House of Representatives for Gwydir
Members of the Australian House of Representatives
1928 births
2011 deaths
Officers of the Order of Australia
People educated at Scots College (Sydney)
20th-century Australian politicians
Government ministers of Australia
Australian Ministers for Health